Macrothemis imitans, the ivory-striped sylph, is a species of skimmer in the dragonfly family Libellulidae. It is found in Central America, North America, and South America.

The IUCN conservation status of Macrothemis imitans is "LC", least concern, with no immediate threat to the species' survival. The population is stable. The IUCN status was reviewed in 2016.

Subspecies
These two subspecies belong to the species Macrothemis imitans:
 Macrothemis imitans imitans Karsch, 1890
 Macrothemis imitans leucozona Ris, 1913

References

Further reading

 

Libellulidae
Articles created by Qbugbot
Insects described in 1890